Ladislav Pazdera (born 6 December 1936) is a Czech gymnast. He competed at the 1960 Summer Olympics and the 1964 Summer Olympics.

References

External links
 

1936 births
Living people
People from Brno-Country District
Czech male artistic gymnasts
Olympic gymnasts of Czechoslovakia
Gymnasts at the 1960 Summer Olympics
Gymnasts at the 1964 Summer Olympics
Sportspeople from the South Moravian Region